The National Abolition Hall of Fame and Museum is located on the second floor of a historic Presbyterian church, located at 5255 Pleasant Valley Road, between Elizabeth and Park Streets, in the hamlet of Peterboro, New York. The church, built in 1820, was listed on the National Register of Historic Places in 1994. Not used as a church since 1870, it has housed the Evans Academy, the Peterboro Union School, and the Peterboro Elementary School. The first floor is now (2022) the Town of Smithfield Town Hall, with the town clerk's office (note small sign at right of building).

In 1835, the inaugural meeting of the New York State Anti-Slavery Society was held in this building. It was held in Peterboro because the original meeting, in Utica, was aborted by pro-slavery protestors, including New York Senator, and the following year New York Attorney General, Samuel Beardsley. Gerrit Smith was from Peterboro and suggested it as a substitute location. 1,000 attended, "the largest convention ever assembled in that State for any purpose whatever".

National Abolition Hall of Fame Members

The following are the inductees of the National Abolition Hall of Fame as of 2022:

 2005
 Frederick Douglass
 William Lloyd Garrison
 Lucretia Mott
 Gerrit Smith
 Harriet Tubman
 2007
 John Brown
 Lydia Maria Child
 Wendell Phillips
 Sojourner Truth
 2009
 Lewis Tappan
 Theodore Dwight Weld
 2011
 Abby Kelley Foster
 Jermain Wesley Loguen
 George Gavin Ritchie
 2013
 Elijah Parish Lovejoy
 Myrtilla Miner
 John Rankin
 Jonathan Walker
 2016
 Rev. John Gregg Fee
 Beriah Green
 Angelina Grimké Weld
 James W.C. Pennington
 2018
 Frances Ellen Watkins Harper
 Laura Smith Haviland
 Samuel Joseph May

References

External links
 National Abolition Hall of Fame and Museum

Presbyterian churches in New York (state)
Churches on the National Register of Historic Places in New York (state)
Federal architecture in New York (state)
Italianate architecture in New York (state)
Churches completed in 1820
19th-century Presbyterian church buildings in the United States
Churches in Madison County, New York
National Register of Historic Places in Madison County, New York
Abolitionism in the United States
Peterboro, New York
Tourist attractions in Madison County, New York
Halls of fame in New York (state)
African-American museums in New York (state)
Women's museums in New York (state)
Museums in Madison County, New York
History museums in New York (state)
American abolitionist organizations
Underground Railroad in New York (state)